Cyril Eric Wool-Lewis (1906 – 1975) was a British Colonial administrator whose responsibilities included the Turks and Caicos Islands.

Wool-Lewis was educated at Cambridge University. He rowed in the winning Cambridge boat in the Boat Race in 1929.

From 1947 to 1952, Wool-Lewis was Commissioner of the Turks and Caicos Islands. He was awarded the O.B.E in 1951.

See also
List of Cambridge University Boat Race crews

References

External links
Cyril Wool-Lewis' rootsweb profile

1906 births
1975 deaths
British male rowers
Cambridge University Boat Club rowers
Commissioners of the Turks and Caicos Islands